Petone Recreation Ground is a cricket ground in Lower Hutt, Wellington, New Zealand.  The first recorded match held on the ground came in 1951 when Hutt Valley played Wanganui in the 1950/51 Hawke Cup.  

The ground later held its first first-class match during the 1991/92 Shell Trophy when Wellington played Otago, with the match ending in an 8 wicket victory for Otago.  A second first-class match was held there during the 1998/99 Shell Trophy when Wellington played Auckland, with the match ending in a draw.  Wellington Women used Petone Recreation Ground as a home venue between 1998 and 2002. From 2015/16 season some Plunket Shield matches will be played when Basin Reserve is unavailable.

References

External links
 
Petrone Recreation Ground at ESPNcricinfo
Petrone Recreation Ground at CricketArchive

Cricket grounds in New Zealand
Sports venues in the Wellington Region